The Lakeside Mountains are about a  long mountain range located on the southwest perimeter of the Great Salt Lake; the range is located in northeast Tooele County and south Box Elder County in Utah, United States.

The north section of the range terminus is at the community of Lakeside, Utah, and the region lies on an eastern border of the Great Salt Lake Desert.

Description
The range is linear, with the two trending sections. The north section actually trends slightly north-northeast, with the south part of it as a mountain area, with Sally Mountain, ; north of it, the range turns into ridgelines and small parallel valleys.

South section
The south section has a due-southeast trendline. A small low elevation saddle separates the south from the north section. Richins Knoll,  is adjacent the saddle, and the mountains southeast begin with a rise to Jedediah Mountain, about 3 mi southeast of the saddle.

Access
Interstate 80 crosses the southern terminus of the Lakeside Mountains, at the townsite of Delle. A northwest stretch of I-80 from Delle, skirts the range foothills, then enters the north of the Cedar Mountains, before turning west through the Great Salt Lake Desert. From the north Cedar Mountains, Puddle Valley Highway (improved road) transits due-north through Puddle Valley, then enters the west flank region of the north section of the range; a small valley called "Death Valley", located in a hilly foothill region, borders the Great Salt Lake Desert, on the desert's east, about 3 mi; Death Ridge, a subridge is 1 mi east; the north mountain terminus near Lakeside continues as named: Scad Ridge, Sedal Valley, Cave Ride, Great Salt Lake shoreline, (all 1 mi apart from each other).

References

External links

 Craner Peak, Lakeside Mountains highpoint (coordinates, (6621 ft))
 Jedediah Mountain (approximate range center-N to S) (coordinates)

Great Salt Lake Desert
Mountain ranges of the Great Basin
Mountain ranges of Box Elder County, Utah
Mountain ranges of Tooele County, Utah
Mountain ranges of Utah